Sergio "Gigi" Sala (born 11 January 1958 in Casatenovo) is an Italian former semi-professional footballer and climber.

Football career 
Sergio started his playing career at San Giorgio, a club based in Casatenovo. He played as a centre back (stopper).

In 1980, when he was 22, he was noticed and recruited by the club Associazione Sportiva Sant'Angelo. He played two seasons with them and then began to get noticed by bigger clubs such as Atalanta, A.C. Monza and Como. However, during one of his last matches with A.S. Sant'Angelo, he broke his meniscus, forcing him to retire from football.

Climbing career 
After Sala's retirement, he became a climber. He was the first person to reach the summit of the mount Resegone in 1985 and the summit of the Grigna in 1988. In both these occasions he reached the summit using only his hands and without any protections. After these achievements he became very famous in the Brianza region.

From 1984 to 2013 he was one of the alpine guides of the CAI of Barzanò.

Personal life 
He is one of the best friends of the singer Francesco Magni (1949–2021). He and Sergio Sala made a few songs together singing in the Brianzoeu dialect. The most famous one is "".

References

1958 births
Living people
Italian footballers
Association footballers not categorized by position